The 2020 Baltimore mayoral election was held on November 3, 2020, concurrent with the general election. Brandon Scott won the Democratic Party's nomination for mayor and the general election.

The primary election was to be held on April 28, 2020, with early voting from April 16 to 23. Due to the coronavirus pandemic, Maryland Governor Larry Hogan announced on March 17, 2020,  that the primary election was postponed to June 2.

Background and candidates
Incumbent Mayor Jack Young, took office by default on May 2, 2019 following the resignation of Mayor Catherine Pugh.  In October 2019, Young announced that he would seek election to remain mayor in 2020.

Notable events since the 2016 election include an escalation of crime following the death of Freddie Gray in April 2015, the removal of Confederate monuments and memorials in 2017, the 2018 rebranding and launch of the BaltimoreLink bus system following Governor Larry Hogan's cancellation of the Red Line, and the Healthy Holly scandal which resulted in Mayor Pugh's resignation in 2019.

Democratic primary
After the first campaign finance reporting date in mid January 2019, Bernard C. "Jack" Young had $960,000 cash on hand, Thiru Vignarajah reported having about $840,000, Brandon Scott had nearly $430,000, Rikki Vaughn $218,000 cash on-hand, Mary Washington had more than $116,000, Sheila Dixon had nearly $89,000, Carlmichael "Stokey" Cannady had nearly $36,000, and T.J. Smith had about $22,000.

Declared candidates
Yasaun Young (No affiliation or relation to Jack Young)
Carlmichael "Stokey" Cannady, anti-violence activist and mediator
Lou Catelli (a.k.a. Will Bauer), unofficial "Mayor of Hampden"
Valerie L. Cunningham
Sheila Dixon, former Mayor of Baltimore and 2016 mayoral candidate
Liri Fusha
Sean B. Gresh, author, professor of communications, former IBM Global Smart Cities communications lead
Michael Douglas Jensen, private citizen
Ralph E. Johnson Jr., author
James Hugh Jones, II, 2018 Democratic gubernatorial candidate
Terry Jay McCready
Mary J. Miller, former T. Rowe Price executive and former Acting Deputy Secretary of the U.S. Department of the Treasury
Erik Powery
Yolanda Pulley, property manager and tenant activist
Brian J Salsberry
Brandon M. Scott, Baltimore City Council President
Keith B. Scott
T.J. Smith, former Baltimore County Executive Press Secretary and Baltimore City Police Spokesperson
Dante Swinton, environmental justice researcher & community organizer
Rikki Vaughn, MBA, 2016 U.S. Senate candidate and multi-restaurant businessman
Thiruvendran "Thiru" Vignarajah, former Maryland Deputy Attorney General
 Robert Wallace, Independent candidate and businessman 
Frederick Ware-Newsome, perennial candidate
Bernard C. "Jack" Young, incumbent Mayor of Baltimore

Withdrawn candidates 

 Lynn Sherwood Harris, former President of the Sandtown-Winchester Improvement Association ⁠— withdrew candidacy on September 23, 2019
Mary Washington, Maryland State Senator for District 43 ⁠— suspended campaign on March 16, 2020

Declined to be candidates

Jill P. Carter, Maryland State Senator for District 41 and 2007 mayoral candidate
Bill Ferguson, President of the Maryland Senate
Ben Jealous, Former Director of the NAACP and 2018 Maryland gubernatorial candidate
Nick Mosby, Maryland State Delegate for District 40

Polling

Results

Republican primary

Declared candidates

Zulieka A. Baysmore
Catalina Byrd, political strategist and member of Baltimore's Women's Commission and Community Oversight Task Force
Ivan Gonzalez
William G. Herd, private citizen
Collins Otonna, 2016 independent candidate for mayor
David Anthony Wiggins, Ranking Member, 2nd Councilmanic District, Baltimore City Republican Central Committee, Co-Founder Temple Afrika, Inc, President, Baltimore Black Think Tank Incorporated 
Shannon Wright, nonprofit executive and former pastor, nominee for Baltimore City Council President in 2016

Results

Independent

Declared candidate
Kahan Singh Dhillon, Jr. filed his candidacy but failed to submit the required number of signatures and does not appear on the general election ballot.
Robert Wallace, Independent candidate and businessman
David Harding, Working Class Party

General election

Polling

Results

Notes

Partisan clients

References

External links
Official campaign websites for mayoral candidates
 Brandon Scott (D) for Mayor
 Robert Wallace (I) for Mayor
 Shannon Wright (R) for Mayor

Baltimore
November 2020 events in the United States
Mayoral elections in Baltimore
Baltimore mayoral